

Eugen Walter Krüger (23 March 1892 – 11 July 1973) was a German general during World War II who commanded the LVIII Panzer Corps. He was a recipient of the Knight's Cross of the Iron Cross of Nazi Germany.

Awards and decorations
 Iron Cross (1914) 2nd Class (9 October 1914) & 1st Class (29 July 1916)
 Knight's Cross of the Military Order of St. Henry (29 April 1918)
 Clasp to the Iron Cross (1939) 2nd Class (12 May 1940) & 1st Class (13 May 1940)
 German Cross in Gold on 27 August 1942 as Generalmajor and commander of 1. Panzer-Division
 Knight's Cross of the Iron Cross with Oak Leaves
 Knight's Cross on 15 July 1941 as Generalmajor and commander of 1. Schützen-Brigade
 373rd Oak Leaves on 5 June 1944 as Generalleutnant and commander of 1. Panzer-Division

References

Citations

Bibliography

 
 
 

1892 births
1973 deaths
People from Zeitz
Generals of Panzer Troops
Recipients of the Gold German Cross
Recipients of the Knight's Cross of the Iron Cross with Oak Leaves
Military personnel from Saxony-Anhalt